To Love Ru is an anime series based on the manga of the same name written by Saki Hasemi and illustrated by Kentaro Yabuki. 

A third season of the anime series, titled To Love Ru Darkness, a sequel manga, was produced by Xebec, directed by Atsushi Ōtsuki, and aired for 12 episodes between October 6 and December 29, 2012. Sentai Filmworks released To Love Ru Darkness on DVD and Blu-ray in North America on July 15, 2014.


Episode list

References

External link

 

Season 3
2012 Japanese television seasons